Lee Jae-joung (born March 1, 1944) is the Unification Minister of South Korea. As head of the Ministry of Unification, Lee is tasked with working toward the reunification of Korea.

Lee assumed the position of Minister for Unification, taking over from Lee Jeong-suk (now a Senior Fellow at the Sejong Institute and Member of the Presidential Advisory Group on the Inter-Korean Summit) in December 2006. The appointment made him the 33rd Minister for Unification, and in the intense prelude to the second inter-Korean Leader's Summit of 2–4 October 2007, the appointment also made him a regular figure in the Korean-language media.

See also
Government of South Korea
Foreign relations of South Korea
Division of Korea

External links
Governor of Gyeonggido Office of Education

  

  

Living people
Government ministers of South Korea
1944 births
People from Cheonan
Members of the National Assembly (South Korea)
Korea University alumni